The Palazzo Brentani is a monumental Neoclassical palace, located on Via Manzoni #6, in the centre of Milan, region of Lombardy, Italy. Both this palace and the adjacent Palazzo Anguissola have sober academic facades, designed by Luigi Canonica in 1829.

History 
The building's rather straightforward appearance is the result of Canonica's restructuring in 1829 when he added a facade divided into three bands by cornices. Between the first and second floors, the building is decorated with medallions of distinguished Italian figures including Alessandro Volta, Leonardo da Vinci, Canova, Pietro Verri, Cesare Beccaria, and Giuseppe Parini. The door is surmounted by a balcony for viewing street processions.

On 4 August 1848, the residence was the scene of the attempted assassination of Charles Albert, king of Sardinia. Standing on the balcony while trying to appease a crowd protesting an imminent armistice with the Austrian army, he was just missed by a rifle shot.

Today, following renovation by Giuseppe De Finetti in 1935, the palace and the adjacent Palazzo Anguissola is home to the Gallerie di Piazza Scala.

Gallery

See also 
Neoclassical architecture in Milan

References 

Palaces in Milan
History of Milan
Neoclassical architecture in Milan
Gallerie di Piazza Scala
Intesa Sanpaolo buildings and structures
Tourist attractions in Milan